The Porsche flat-six engine series is a line of mechanically similar, naturally aspirated and turbocharged, flat-six boxer engines, produced by Porsche for almost 60 consecutive years, since 1963. The engine is an evolution of the flat-four boxer used in the original Volkswagen Beetle.

The flat-six engine is most often associated with their 911 model, Porsche's flagship rear-engined sports car which has used flat-six engines exclusively since 1963. The engines were air-cooled until  1999, when Porsche started using water-cooled engines.

The naturally-aspirated 4.0-litre flat-six engine (the largest engine offered in a street-legal 911) was introduced with their 911 (997) GT3 RS 4.0, in 2011. The engine itself uses the crankshaft from the RSR with increased stroke dimensions (from 76.4 mm to 80.4 mm). Only 600 cars were built.

Other Porsche models that use flat-six engines are the 1970–1972 Porsche 914/6 (mid-engine), the 1986–1993 Porsche 959 (rear-engine), and the 1996–2021 Porsche Boxster/Cayman (mid-engine).

The Porsche 962 sports prototype also used a twin-turbocharged flat-six engine.

These engines have also been used by German tuning company RUF in various replica Porsche sports cars.

Applications

Road cars

Porsche
1963–present Porsche 911
1963–1989 original Porsche 911
1989–1993 Porsche 964
1994–1998 Porsche 993
1997–2006 Porsche 996
2004–2013 Porsche 997
2011–2019 Porsche 991
2019–present Porsche 992
1970–1972 Porsche 914/6
1986–1993 Porsche 959
1996–present Porsche Boxster
2005–present Porsche Cayman

RUF
Ruf BTR
Ruf BTR2
Ruf CTR Yellowbird
Ruf CTR2
Ruf CTR3
Ruf RGT
Ruf RK
Ruf R Kompressor
Ruf Rt 12
Ruf RTR
Ruf RTurbo
Ruf SCR
Ruf CTR Anniversary
Ruf CTR3
Ruf SCR 2018
Ruf Turbo Florio
Ruf Turbo R

Race cars
 Porsche 914/6 GT
 Porsche 934
 Porsche 934/5
 Porsche 935
 Porsche 936
 Porsche 956
 Porsche 961
 Porsche 962
 Porsche WSC-95
 Porsche 911 GT1
 Porsche 911 GT2
 Porsche 911 GT3
 Riley MkXI/Riley MkXX/Riley MkXXII/Riley MkXIVI

References

Boxer engines
Flat engines
Flat-six engines
Porsche
Porsche in motorsport